Jana Novotná and Andrea Strnadová were the defending champions but only Novotná competed that year with Laura Golarsa.

Golarsa and Novotná lost in the quarterfinals to Sabine Appelmans and Laurence Courtois.

Appelmans and Courtois won in the final 6–4, 6–4 against Mary Pierce and Andrea Temesvári.

Seeds
Champion seeds are indicated in bold text while text in italics indicates the round in which those seeds were eliminated.

 Laura Golarsa /  Jana Novotná (quarterfinals)
 Katerina Maleeva /  Leila Meskhi (semifinals)
 Karin Kschwendt /  Caroline Vis (quarterfinals)
 Julie Halard /  Nathalie Tauziat (quarterfinals)

Draw

External links
 1994 Open Gaz de France Doubles Draw

Open GDF Suez
1994 WTA Tour